Simón Peredes (born 24 December 1945) is a Peruvian basketball player. He competed in the men's tournament at the 1964 Summer Olympics.

References

External links
 

1945 births
Living people
Peruvian men's basketball players
1967 FIBA World Championship players
Olympic basketball players of Peru
Basketball players at the 1964 Summer Olympics
Place of birth missing (living people)
20th-century Peruvian people